Clitae or Kleitai was a town in the interior of Bithynia (or Paphlagonia), mentioned by Ptolemy. It lay east of the Parthenius River. 

The site of Clitae is unknown.

References

Populated places in Bithynia
Populated places in ancient Paphlagonia
Former populated places in Turkey
Lost ancient cities and towns